Elaine Mason may refer to:

Elaine Mason, nurse and wife of physicist Stephen Hawking 
Elaine Mason, co-designer of Topiary Park in Columbus, Ohio